Dan Z. Reinstein is a specialist ophthalmic surgeon in the UK and is a board-certified registered specialist ophthalmologist in the US, Canada and the UK, specialising in the field of refractive surgery (vision correction). He is medical director of the London Vision Clinic and a voluntary faculty member as Professor of Ophthalmology at Columbia University College of Physicians and Surgeons as well as a Visiting Professor at the University of Ulster, UK and Professeur Associé at the Faculty of Medicine, Sorbonne Université, Paris, France.

Education and early career
Reinstein was educated at Leighton Park School before completing his undergraduate and medical school education at the University of Cambridge. His postgraduate qualifications include M.A.(Cantab), M.B. B.Chir and MD degrees. He undertook extensive post-doctorate fellowship sub-specialty training in refractive surgery, having completed a Research Fellowship in Ophthalmic Epidemiology (UCL Institute of Ophthalmology/Moorfields Eye Hospital.

Medical Career and Research
Reinstein is an ophthalmologist and research scientist in the field of laser eye surgery, therapeutic refractive surgery (corneal complex refractive surgery) and vision correction.

Personal life
Married to Austrian veterinarian and researcher Ursula Reinstein (née Heczko), they have three children and live in central London. He is medical director of the London Vision Clinic.

References

External links
 
 
 Dan Reinstein profile on Research Gate

1962 births
Living people
American ophthalmologists
Canadian ophthalmologists
British ophthalmologists
Columbia University faculty